Kilconnell is a small rural village in County Galway, Ireland.  The village gives its name to the barony of Kilconnell, formerly held by the Lords de Freyne. In 2006 David Tye purchased the original feudal Barony of Kilconnell created in 1170 from Lord de Freyne and is the present holder. The feudal Barony of Kilconnell is registered in Ireland. There is also a peerage title, Baron Kilconnel, created in 1797, and later a subsidiary title of the Earls of Clancarty.

Its rural population in 2011 was 670. The land is mainly used for dairy farming and the raising of cattle.

It was once part of the kingdom of the Soghain of Connacht before being conquered by the Uí Maine.

The last known prosecution of a priest under the Popery Acts was the trial in 1822 of Fr John O'Connor, parish priest of Aughrim and Kilconnell, at the Galway Summer Assizes. He was acquitted.

This village was the birthplace of Fianna Fáil Teachta Dála (TD) Johnny Callanan (1910–1982). His nephew Joe Callanan was also a TD for the Galway East constituency.

Kilconnell Abbey

Kilconnell abbey is a Franciscan friary, founded in 1414, by William O'Kelly, Lord of Uí Maine, known locally as the Abbey. Although in ruins it is maintained by the OPW. The abbey is the burial place for the O'Kelly sept, whose family crest can be seen on some of the headstones. In the 1580s and 1590s, Charles Calthorpe, the Attorney General for Ireland, held the abbey on a 21-year lease.

The Papal Nuncio Archbishop Giovanni Rinuccini stayed in the Abbey on 20 June 1648 on his way back from the Confederation at Kilkenny.

The abbey is believed to have been uninhabited since about 1785 due to a fall in vocations.

There is a passage that runs under the abbey to the grounds of Ballinderry house. It was excavated in the 1940s but was not navigated due to the risk of collapse.

Uí Maine
The area around Kilconnell was the stronghold of the O'Kellys, lords of Uí Maine and the Donnellan clans.

Kilconnell is in the parish of Aughrim and Kilconnell. Aughrim was the site of a decisive battle of the Williamite wars in 1691. The French General the Marquis de St Ruth had rallied the Irish towards victory when his head was blown off by cannon fire and the Irish fled the field, only to be cut down in their thousands by the English forces. Hundreds of the O'Kellys lost their lives in this battle.

The local lake, Lough Acalla, has a crannog in the centre and is a rainbow trout fishery.

Ballinderry House

Ballinderry House, the former seat of the Comyn family, who are relations of Daniel O'Connell, has been restored and is now a guest house.

Athletic clubs
 
The local GAA team is called St. Gabriels. In 1979 they won a Galway football title. Since then they have won the Junior B championship and Junior A league. They won "underage club of the year" in 2011. St Gabriels Ladies GAA football club plays Gaelic football and represents the parishes of Kilconnell, Aughrim, Kilreekil and Cappataggle. St Gabriels Ladies GAA Football Club plays its home games in Aughrim and it trains also in Kilconnell at the St Gabriels sports complex.

See also
 List of abbeys and priories in Ireland (County Galway)
 List of towns and villages in Ireland

References

Towns and villages in County Galway
National Monuments in County Galway